The More Things Change... is the second studio album by American heavy metal band Machine Head, released on March 25, 1997 through Roadrunner Records. It is the band's last release to feature original lead guitarist Logan Mader, and the first to feature drummer Dave McClain. The album's title alludes to the first part of the phrase, "The more things change, the more they stay the same"; the same phrase is mentioned during the chorus of "Struck a Nerve". The More Things Change... reached #138 on the Billboard 200 chart in 1997, and as of 2002 had sold over 115,000 copies in the United States. In 2020, it was named one of the 20 best metal albums of 1997 by Metal Hammer magazine.

Track listing

Personnel

Machine Head
 Robb Flynn – lead vocals, rhythm guitar
 Logan Mader – lead guitar
 Adam Duce – bass, backing vocals
 Dave McClain – drums

Production
 Robb Flynn – mixing
 Vincent Wojno – engineering
 Colin Richardson – mixing, production
 Andy Sneap – mixing
 Steve Baughman – mixing assistance
 Ted Jensen – mastering

Chart performance

References

External links
The More Things Change... at machinehead1.com

Machine Head (band) albums
1997 albums
Roadrunner Records albums
Speed metal albums
Progressive metal albums by American artists